Rigan County is in Kerman province, Iran. The capital of the county is the city of Mohammadabad. At the 2006 census, the region's population (as most of Rigan District in Bam County) was 53,059 in 11,380 households. The following census in 2011 counted 66,335 people in 17,598 households, by which time those parts had been separated from the county to form Rigan County. At the 2016 census, the county's population was 88,410 in 23,983 households.

Administrative divisions

The population history and structural changes of Rigan County's administrative divisions over three consecutive censuses are shown in the following table. The latest census shows two districts, four rural districts, and two cities.

References

 

Counties of Kerman Province